Tobias "Tobi" Lütke  is the billionaire founder and CEO of Shopify, an e-commerce company based in Ottawa, Ontario, Canada. He has been part of the core team of the Ruby on Rails framework and has created open source libraries such as Active Merchant. As of 2022 he was the 11th richest Canadian.

Early life
Lütke was born in Koblenz, Germany in 1981. He received a Schneider CPC (German brand of the Amstrad Colour Personal Computer distributed by the Schneider Rundfunkwerke AG) from his parents at the age of six. By 11 or 12, he began rewriting the code of the games he played and modifying  computer hardware as a hobby. Lütke dropped out of school and entered an apprenticeship program at the Koblenzer Carl-Benz-School to become a computer programmer after tenth grade. He moved from Germany to Canada in 2002.

Lütke cites John Carmack's .plan-files from the mid-1990's as "making a huge impression" on him as a teenager and calls them a "a master class in systems design".

Career
In 2004, Lütke, along with his partners, Daniel Weinand and Scott Lake, launched Snowdevil, an online snowboard shop. Lütke built a new e-commerce platform for the site, using Ruby on Rails. Soon after, the Snowdevil founders shifted their focus from snowboards to e-commerce and launched Shopify in 2006. He currently owns 7% of Shopify, which went public in 2015. Despite controlling a minority of the shares outstanding, he controls a 40% voting interest in Shopify due to a two-class voting structure.

The Globe and Mail named Lütke "CEO of the Year" in November 2014. Lütke was presented with the Meritorious Service Cross on November 5, 2018, for his work in supporting the growth of the Canadian technology industry. In 2019, Lütke donated $1,000,001 to Team Trees, the biggest donation as of December 14, 2022, with the message, "For the Lorax". In 2021, Lütke donated $1,200,001 to Team Seas, the 4th biggest donation as of December 14, 2022, with the message "For the Lorax... but wet.".

On September 8, 2021, it was announced that Lütke, along with former and current Shopify top executives and Celtic House Venture Partners, invested $3 million in Creative Layer, "a global personalized print-on-demand platform for managing Shopify orders, proofs, fulfillment, and team members".

References

1981 births
Living people
Businesspeople from Ottawa
People from Koblenz
German emigrants to Canada
Canadian chief executives
Canadian company founders
Canadian billionaires
Naturalized citizens of Canada